Lieutenant General Richard C. Nash (born 1950) was the 30th adjutant general of the Minnesota National Guard, having been appointed to that position by the governor of Minnesota in 2010. Nash had previously served as commanding general of both US Army and multi-national forces including the US Army's 34th Red Bull Infantry Division, the Multi-National Division-South during Operation Iraqi Freedom, and the Multi-National Brigade-North (SFOR-14) in Bosnia Herzegovina during Operation Joint Forge.

His prior positions also include special assistant to the combatant commander, North American Aerospace Defense Command (NORAD), United States Northern Command, and assistant division commander (maneuver) for the 34th Infantry Division in Iraq.

Education
Nash received a Bachelor of Science degree in health, biology and physical education from Minnesota State University, Mankato in 1972. He is also a graduate of the US Army War College and the United States Army Infantry School's Basic and Advanced Infantry Officer Courses.

Personal history
Born in Minnesota on September 10, 1950, Nash spent his civilian career in construction management, working in executive positions at Hanson Spancrete Midwest, Maple Grove, and Fabcon, Inc. Nash retired from Hanson Spancrete Midwest as the vice president in 2004 in order to devote more time to his military responsibilities.

Military career
Nash was drafted into the Army July 16, 1972, and after graduating from Mankato State University, he received his commission as a second lieutenant on April 11, 1976. His first assignment was as a communications platoon leader, Headquarters Company, 1st Brigade, 47th Infantry Division, in Stillwater, Minnesota.

He then served with 1st Battalion, 135th Infantry Regiment, in Rochester, Minnesota. There he served as a platoon leader and detachment commander for Company C, Battalion S-2 and Battalion S-4. Following his attendance at the Infantry Officer Advanced Course, Nash assumed command of Company C, 1st Battalion, 135th Infantry Regiment, and later moved on to serve as the battalion's operations officer (S-3). He continued in the operations officer role when he was transferred to 1st Brigade, 47th Infantry Division in 1989.

In 1991, Nash returned to the 135th Infantry Regiment, but this time to the 2nd Battalion as battalion commander. Upon his promotion to colonel, he assumed command of the 1st Brigade, 34th Infantry Division, out of Stillwater, Minnesota, until 1999, when he became the director of facility management at Little Falls, Minnesota.

On October 1, 2000, Nash was promoted to the rank of brigadier general and was promoted to assistant division commander (maneuver) of the 34th Infantry Division. From June 2003 to April 2004, Nash served as commanding general of the Multi-National Brigade (North) (SFOR-14) during Operation Joint Forge in Bosnia Herzegovina, and upon his return to the United States, he resumed his position as assistant division commander for the 34th Infantry Division.

On June 22, 2004, Nash received his second star. Along with this promotion to the rank of major general, Nash was appointed to serve as special assistant to the combatant commander of North American Aerospace Defense Command (NORAD) and United States Northern Command (NORTHCOM) and the command's National Guard Liaison.

In 2007, Nash returned to the 34th Infantry Division, this time to serve as the division's commanding general. Two years later, in February 2009, the division deployed for a year-long tour of duty in Iraq in support of Operation Iraqi Freedom. Nash assumed command of the Multi-National Division South (MND-South) (also known as Task Force Mountain), based at Contingency Operating Base Basra. The forces of MND-South primarily consisted of Iraqi Security Forces supported by the US Army's 34th Infantry Division. The primary mission of MND-South was to assist and support Iraqi security forces with security and stability missions in the area south of Baghdad ranging from Najaf to Wasit provinces extending south to Basra. Due to the departure of British and Polish forces from adjoining regions, Nash's MND-South was responsible for a much larger area of operations than previous forces stationed in the Basra region. The withdrawal of the Polish forces that had led the Multi-National Division Central-South (MND-Central South) forced the U.S. led Multi-National Division Center (MND-Center) to shift into areas formerly controlled by MND-Central South, leaving Nash's MND-South responsible for much of the area south of Baghdad that had previously been under the control of MND-Center. Then, as British forces prepared to depart from Iraq, on March 31, 2009, MND-South assumed responsibility for additional areas that had been controlled by the British-led Multi-National Division South East (MND-South East). After a highly successful deployment and highest ranking suicide in the MN National guard, the 34th Infantry Division returned to the United States in February 2010.

Nash remained commander of the 34th Infantry Division until November 2010, when Minnesota Governor Tim Pawlenty appointed him as the 30th Adjutant General of the Minnesota National Guard. As adjutant general, Nash oversaw the entire forces of the state's Army and Air National Guard units, which include the 34th Infantry Division, 34th Combat Aviation Brigade, 133rd Airlift Wing, 148th Fighter Wing, 84th Troop Command, 347th Regional Support Group, 175th Regiment Regional Training Center, and the Camp Ripley Training Center, in addition to numerous smaller and subordinate units. As adjutant general, Nash was the administrative head of the Minnesota Department of Military Affairs and he oversaw the day-to-day operation and management of the fiscal, personnel, equipment and real property resources of the Minnesota National Guard and Minnesota Department of Military Affairs.

Promotions

Decorations and badges

References

Living people
1950 births
United States Army generals
National Guard (United States) generals
Recipients of the Distinguished Service Medal (US Army)
Recipients of the Legion of Merit
United States Army personnel of the Iraq War
Military leaders of the Iraq War
United States Army War College alumni
Minnesota State University, Mankato alumni
Recipients of the Defense Superior Service Medal
Minnesota National Guard personnel